Elise Brookfield Heinz (January 14, 1935January 19, 2014) was an American lawyer and politician. She was a member of the Virginia House of Delegates from 1978 to 1981, representing the 23rd district as a Democrat.

Early life and education
Heinz was born on January 14, 1935, in Plainfield, New Jersey, and grew up in Alexandria, Virginia. She graduated from Wellesley College with a BA in 1955 and received an LLB from Harvard Law School in 1961.

Career
Before her election to the Virginia House, Heinz served in the Peace Corps, clerked for U.S. Judge David Bazelon and worked as a lawyer in private practice, as well as served on the Arlington School Board and handled cases pro bono for the American Civil Liberties Union and the Women's Legal Defense Fund. Heinz became known for campaigning for the Equal Rights Amendment (ERA) and as of 1973, helped lead the National Organization for Women in Virginia. In 1974, Heinz represented John Patler—who killed George Lincoln Rockwell, founder of the American Nazi Party. As of 1975, she ran ERA-Central, a pro-ERA organization.

Heinz won election to the Virginia House of Delegates in 1977, and won re-election once, but her district consisting of parts of both Arlington and Alexandria was eliminated in the redistricting following the 1980 census. She thus was forced to challenge the three Arlington incumbents and came in fourth in the Democratic primary in September, 1981.

Heinz died on January 19, 2014, in Arlington, Virginia.

References 

1935 births
2014 deaths
Harvard Law School alumni
Democratic Party members of the Virginia House of Delegates
People from Alexandria, Virginia
People from Plainfield, New Jersey
Wellesley College alumni
20th-century American politicians
Women state legislators in Virginia